{{DISPLAYTITLE:C26H36O5}}
The molecular formula C26H36O5 (molar mass: 428.56 g/mol, exact mass: 428.2563 u) may refer to:

 Acetomepregenol (ACM), also called mepregenol diacetate 
 Dicirenone
 Domoprednate